Dapediidae is an extinct family of neopterygian ray-finned fish that lived during from the Late Triassic to Late Jurassic (Norian to Tithonian). It is the only family of the order Dapediiformes. Its members were historically placed within the ginglymodian family Semionotidae, but were moved to their own family in 1966.

Description 
Dapediids had deep, laterally flattened circular bodies covered in thick ganoid scales, which gave them a resemblance to the pycnodontiforms, a group they may or may not be related to. Their teeth were adapted towards a durophagous diet; some dapediids fed on hard-shelled invertebrates, while at least one genus (Hemicalypterus) may have been herbivorous.

Classification 
Dapediids are usually considered to be either basal ginglymodians or stem group representatives of the wider clade Holostei, but some studies have found them to be early-diverging stem-teleosts instead.

References 

 
Prehistoric ray-finned fish families